Vlasto is a surname. Notable people with the surname include:

Chris Vlasto (born 1966), American television producer
Dominique Vlasto (born 1946), French politician
James S. Vlasto (born 1934) Press Secretary to Governor Hugh L. Carey of New York
George S. Vlasto (1928–2014) Assistant Professor of Physiology and Neurobiology at University of Connecticut
Alexis P. Vlasto (1915–2000) Slavonic scholar at Cambridge University
Julie Vlasto (1903–1985), French tennis player
Solon Stylien J. Vlasto (1852–1927) Founder of the Atlantis newspaper

See also
Vlastos